The South Africa national women's cricket team toured the Netherlands in 2007, playing one Test match and three women's One Day Internationals.

Test series

Only Test

One Day International series

1st ODI

2nd ODI

3rd ODI

References

International cricket competitions in 2007
2007–08 South African cricket season
Netherlands women's national cricket team
International cricket tours of the Netherlands
Netherlands
cricket
cricket
2007 in women's cricket
August 2007 sports events in Europe
July 2007 sports events in Europe
International women's cricket competitions in the Netherlands